Slow Train through Georgia is a compilation album of American guitarist Norman Blake, released in 1987. It contains songs from Blake's releases in the 1970s.

Track listing
 "Fiddler's Dram/Whiskey Before Breakfast" (Traditional) – 3:31
 "Slow Train Through Georgia" (Norman Blake) – 4:06
 "Old Grey Mare" (Traditional) – 3:29
 "Down Home Summertime Blues" (Blake) – 3:40
 "Spanish Fandango" (Traditional) – 3:47
 "Randall Collins" (Blake) – 1:52
 "Church Street Blues" (Blake) – 2:52
 "Done Gone" (Traditional) – 1:36
 "Bully of the Town" (Traditional) – 2:00
 "Nashville Blues" (Alton Delmore) – 3:45
 "Ginseng Sullivan" (Blake) – 3:29
 "Macon Rag" (Blake) – 2:41
 "Nobody's Business" (Traditional) – 3:13
 "The Streamlined Cannonball" (Traditional) – 4:57
 "Cattle in the Cane" (Traditional) – 2:10
 "Little Joe" (Traditional) – 2:36
 "Weave and Way" (Traditional) – 2:23
 "Six White Horses" (Traditional) – 4:56
 "Richland Avenue (Front Porch Wood Pile) Rag" (Blake) – 1:54
 "The Banks of Good Hope/The Green Fields of America" (Traditional) – 5:53
 "Columbus Stockade Blues" (Traditional) – 3:28
 "Down at Mylow's House" (Blake) – 1:17

Personnel

Norman Blake – vocals, guitar, mandolin
Nancy Blake – cello
Charlie Collins – fiddle, guitar
Peter Ostroushko – fiddle, mandolin
Mick Moloney – banjo
Eugene O'Donnell – fiddle
Tut Taylor – dobro

Norman Blake (American musician) albums
1987 compilation albums